Spilarctia venata is a moth of the family Erebidae. It was described by Alfred Ernest Wileman in 1915. It is found in the Philippines.

References

venata
Moths described in 1915